Antigua and Barbuda competed at the 2020 Summer Olympics in Tokyo. Originally scheduled to take place from 24 July to 9 August 2020, the Games were postponed to 23 July to 8 August 2021, because of the COVID-19 pandemic. It was the nation's eleventh appearance at the Summer Olympics.

Competitors
The following is the list of number of competitors in the Games.

Athletics

Athletes from Antigua and Barbuda achieved the entry standards, either by qualifying time or by world ranking, in the following track and field events (up to a maximum of 3 athletes in each event):

Track & road events

Boxing

Antigua and Barbuda entered one boxer into the Olympic tournament for the first time since 1988. With the cancellation of the 2021 Pan American Qualification Tournament in Buenos Aires, Argentina, Alston Ryan finished fifth in the men's featherweight division to secure a place on the Antiguan team based on the IOC's Boxing Task Force Rankings for the Americas.

Sailing

Antigua and Barbuda received an invitation from the Tripartite Commission to compete in the Laser Radial class, marking the country's recurrence to the sport for the first time in two decades. 

M = Medal race; EL = Eliminated – did not advance into the medal race

Swimming

Antigua and Barbuda received a universality invitation from FINA to send two top-ranked swimmers (one per gender) in their respective individual events to the Olympics, based on the FINA Points System of June 28, 2021.

See also
Antigua and Barbuda at the 2019 Pan American Games

References

Nations at the 2020 Summer Olympics
2020
Olympics